The Namaqua caco or Namaqua dainty frog (Cacosternum namaquense) is a species of frog in the family Pyxicephalidae found in Namibia and South Africa.
Its natural habitats are subtropical or tropical dry shrubland, intermittent rivers, intermittent freshwater marshes, freshwater springs, and rocky areas.
It is threatened by habitat loss.

References

Cacosternum
Taxonomy articles created by Polbot
Amphibians described in 1910